Salona was an ancient Roman city on the Adriatic Sea in Dalmatia.

Salona may also refer to:

 Amfissa, a town in central Greece previously called Salona
 Latin Bishopric of Salona, a Catholic titular and former residential see
 Salona, Wisconsin, a town in the United States
 Salona (McLean, Virginia), Light Horse Harry Lee homestead